Robert of Molesme (1028 – 17 April 1111) was  an abbot, one of the founders of the Cistercian Order and is honored as a Christian saint.

Life
Robert was born about 1029 near Troyes, a younger son of Thierry and Ermengarde, nobles of Champagne. He entered the Benedictine abbey of Montier-la-Celle near Troyes at age fifteen and rose to the office of prior.

He was made the abbot of Saint Michel-de-Tonnerre around the year 1070, but he soon discovered that the monks were quarrelsome and disobedient, so he returned to Montier-la-Celle.

Meanwhile, two hermits from a group of monks that had settled at Collan went to Rome and asked Pope Gregory VII to give them Robert as their superior. The pope granted their request, and as of 1074 Robert served as their leader. Soon after, Robert moved the small community to Molesme in the valley of Langres in Burgundy. Initially, the establishment consisted of only huts made of branches surrounding a chapel in the forest, dedicated to the Holy Trinity. Molesme Abbey quickly became known for its piety and sanctity, and Robert's reputation as a saintly man grew. It is because of this reputation that in 1082 Bruno of Cologne came to Robert seeking advice. He lived with Robert's community for a time before going on to found the Grande Chartreuse, the first Carthusian monastery.

In 1098 there were 35 dependent priories of Molesme, and other annexes and some priories of nuns. Donors from the surrounding area vied with one another in helping the monks; soon they had more than they needed, slackened their way of life and became tepid. Benefactors sent their children to the abbey for education and other non-monastic activities began to dominate daily life. The vast land holdings they had acquired required a large number of employees. As the community grew increasingly wealthy, it began to attract men seeking entry for the wrong reasons. They caused a division among the brothers, challenging Robert's severity. Robert twice tried to leave Molesme but was ordered back by the Pope.

Cîteaux

In 1098, Robert and twenty-one of his monks left Molesme with the intention of never returning. Renaud, the viscount of Beaune, gave this group a desolate valley in a deep forest; there they founded Cîteaux Abbey. Stephen Harding and Alberic – two of Robert's monks from Molesme – were pivotal in founding the new house. The archbishop of Lyons, being persuaded that they could not subsist there without  the endorsement of an influential churchman, wrote in their favour to Eudo, duke of Burgundy. Eudo paid for the construction they had begun, helped the monks finance their operating expenses and gave them much land and cattle. The bishop of Challons elevated the new monastery to the canonical status of an abbey.

In 1099, the monks of Molesme asked Robert to return and agreed to submit entirely to his interpretation of the Rule of St. Benedict; the local bishop also pressured Robert to return. He agreed and Molesme became a major center for the Benedictines under his tutelage. Albéric was made successor abbot at Cîteaux, with Stephen Harding as prior.

Robert died on 17 April 1111. Pope Honorius III canonized him in 1222. His feast day in the Roman Catholic Church is also on 17 April, with the Benedictines celebrating him, along with Alberic of Cîteaux and Stephen Harding on February 26.

The Vie de saint Robert de Molesme was written by Guy, his immediate successor as abbot of Molesme.

References

1020s births
1111 deaths

Year of birth uncertain
People from Troyes
French Cistercians
French Benedictines
French abbots
Founders of Catholic religious communities
12th-century Christian saints
Medieval French saints
Cistercian abbots general
Cistercian saints